Future Electronics Inc. is a distributor of electronic and electro-mechanical components headquartered in Pointe-Claire, Quebec. It was founded in 1968 by Canadian billionaire Robert Miller. By 1976, Miller became the sole owner of the company after he bought out his partner for $500,000.

Future Electronics is one of Quebec's largest privately owned companies and is currently the third largest electronics distributor in the world. It operates in 170 locations in 44 countries in the Americas, Europe, Asia, Africa and Oceania.

It follows a business model that emphasizes zero debt and the willingness to buy and hold inventories, allowing the company to maintain positive relationship with component suppliers. In 2014, its revenues were $5 billion.

See also 

 Competitor Tech Data
 Competitor CDW
 Competitor Synnex

References

External links
 Future Electronics

Electronic component distributors
Electronics companies of Canada
Companies based in Pointe-Claire
Business services companies established in 1968
1968 establishments in Quebec
Electronics companies established in 1968